The PDP-15 was the fifth and last of the 18-bit minicomputers produced by Digital Equipment Corporation.  The PDP-1 was first delivered in December 1959 and the first PDP-15 was delivered in February 1970. More than 400 of these successors to the PDP-9 (and 9/L) were ordered within the first eight months.

In addition to operating systems, the PDP-15 had compilers for Fortran and ALGOL.

History
The 18-bit PDP systems preceding the PDP-15 were named PDP-1, PDP-4, PDP-7 & PDP-9.
The last PDP-15 was produced in 1979.

Hardware

The PDP-15 was DEC's only 18-bit machine constructed from TTL integrated circuits rather than discrete transistors, and, like every DEC 18-bit system could be equipped with:
 an optional X-Y (point-plot or vector graphics) display.
 a hardware floating point option, with a 10x speedup, was offered.
 up to 128Kwords of core main memory

Models
The PDP-15 models offered by DEC were:
 PDP-15/10: a 4K-word paper-tape based system
 PDP-15/20: 8K, added DECtape
 PDP-15/30: 16K word, added memory protection and a foreground/background Monitor
 PDP-15/35: Added a 524K-word fixed-head disk drive
 PDP-15/40: 24K memory
 PDP-15/50:

PDP-15/76
 PDP-15/76: 15/40 plus PDP-11 frontend. The PDP-15/76 was a dual-processor system that shared memory with an attached PDP-11/05.. The PDP-11 served as a peripheral processor and enabled use of  Unibus peripherals.

Software
DECsys, RSX-15, and XVM/RSX were the operating systems supplied by DEC for the PDP-15. A batch processing monitor (BOSS-15: Batch Operating Software System) was also available.

DECsys
The first DEC-supplied mass-storage operating system available for the PDP-15 was DECsys, an interactive single-user system. This software was provided on a DECtape reel, of which copies were made for each user.  This copied DECtape was then added to by the user, and thus was storage
for personal programs and data.  A second DECtape was used as a scratch tape by the assembler and the Fortran compiler.

 RSX-15 
RSX-15 was released by DEC in 1971. The main architect for RSX-15 (later renamed XVM/RSX) was Dennis "Dan" Brevik.

Once XVM/RSX was released, DEC facilitated that "a PDP-15 can be field-upgraded to XVM" but it required "the addition of the XM15 memory processor."

The RSX-11 operating system began as a port of RSX-15 to the PDP-11, although it later diverged significantly in terms of design and functionality.

Origin of the RSX-15 name
Commenting on the RSX acronym, Brevik says:

XVM/RSX
Later versions of the PDP-15 could run a real-time multi-user OS called XVM/RSX, an outgrowth of RSX-15. The XVM'' upgrade to RSX was multi-user, and enabled up to six concurrent teletype-based users. XVM Support for the PDP-15/76 included using an RK05 disk drive.

non-DEC
One other operating system, developed on the PDP-7, was also available for the PDP-15:
 MUMPS, which was originally developed in 1966

Application software
DEC provided mathematical, scientific and commercial software application tools.

See also
 Programmed Data Processor

References

External links
 a diary re PDP-15 & RSX-15

DEC minicomputers
18-bit computers
Transistorized computers
Computer-related introductions in 1970